Prince David Bagrationi Mukhrani (Mukran-Batoni [მუხრანბატონი]) of Georgia, David Bagration de Moukhrani y Zornoza, or Davit Bagrationi-Mukhraneli (born 24 June 1976), is the Head of the Princely House of Mukhrani, a branch of the Georgian Bagrationi dynasty and claims by primogeniture to be the head of the Royal House of Bagrationi, which reigned in Georgia from the medieval era until the early 19th century. 

His family is related to the House of Bourbón, the House of Wittelsbach, the House of Habsburg-Lorraine, and the House of Romanov. Prince Davit succeeded his father Prince Giorgi (Jorge) Bagration Mukhrani as claimant to the Georgian throne upon his death on 16 January 2008. 

Prince Davit returned his family to Georgia in 2003, ending decades of exile resulting from the 1921 Red Army invasion of Georgia. He married Princess Ana Bagration-Gruzinsky, a member of the genealogically junior Gruzinsky branch of the Bagrationi, in 2009, divorcing in 2013. Their son Prince Giorgi, born in Georgia in 2011, is the heir apparent to the throne.

Early life
Bagrationi was born to the Georgian émigré family as the second son of Spanish race car driver, Prince George Bagrationi-Mukhraneli, by his first wife María de las Mercedes Zornoza y Ponce de León (1942–2020) in Madrid, Spain. He has an older sister, Maria-Antonietta, and brother, Irakly, and a younger half-brother, Gourami (Ugo). Bagrationi is also a cousin of Grand Duchess Maria Vladimirovna of Russia, head of the Russian Imperial House, as her mother was born Princess Leonida Bagration of Mukhrani.

Dynastic activities
Bagrationi settled permanently in Georgia's capital of Tbilisi in 2003 and obtained dual citizenship from Georgia in 2004. He has also been an altar server to Ilia II, Catholicos-Patriarch of All Georgia.

In January 2008, Bagrationi announced his father's death, declaring himself to be his father's successor as the patrilineal head of the Georgian royal family while his elder brother, Irakly, continued to reside in Spain. As such his supporters recognize him as Royal Prince of Kartli and Hereditary Prince of the sovereign principality (satavado) of Mukhrani. Bagrationi's paternal grandfather, Prince Irakly Bagration-Mukhransky, had claimed headship of the Bagrationi dynasty in 1957 and, as such, the additional designations of Prince and Head of the Royal House of Georgia, of Kartalia, and of Mukhrani, Duke of the Lasos, Sovereign Head and Grand Master of the Order of the Eagle of Georgia and of the Order of the Queen-Saint Tamara, styles which his grandson also claims. As the Mukhrani line are related by marriage to the Spanish Royal family, Bagrationi was among the guests invited to King Felipe VI's 2014 enthronement as king.

During the Russia–Georgia war over South Ossetia in August 2008, Bagrationi accompanied Georgian soldiers to the front-line to render moral support. He commented afterwards that he regretted Georgia "had to pay such a high price to show the world the true face of Russia," and issued a message to the Georgian nation. Bagrationi believes that restoration of monarchy in Georgia is not an option at this time because of ongoing Russian occupation of parts of the country; and it is up to the people of Georgia to decide when the monarchy should be restored.

During his second royal visit to the United Kingdom, on 8 March 2017, Prince David was received at Kensington Palace where he presented the insignia of the Grand Collar of the Order of the Eagle of Georgia to Prince Richard, Duke of Gloucester and his wife Birgitte, Duchess of Gloucester on behalf of Queen Elizabeth II. On 16 December 2018 Prince David was invited to the inauguration of Georgia's first female President, Salome Zourabichvili,  Prince David has been involved in numerous Georgian cultural and other broadly humanitarian charities, including one of the largest fundraisers in GoFundMe history, when the joined arms with massively popular Instagram influencer Tommy Marcus (aka meme activist Qarantino) and UNWTO ambassador Shiv Shanker Nair\ raised $7 million to rescue some 2000 death marked Afghan reformers from the Taliban.  Prince David was the "First Godfather" at the marriage the last Russian "Tsar's Heir, Grand Duke George of Russia to Victoria Bettarini. David's grandfather and George's grandmother were siblings. The October 1, 2021 religious ceremony was widely covered by the international media and was attended by many European royal families and other notables.

Marriage and divorce

Prince David Bagration of Mukhrani married Princess Ana Bagration-Gruzinsky on 8 February 2009 at the Tbilisi Sameba Cathedral. This marriage had come to fruition with the support and blessing by the pro-monarchist Catholicos Patriarch of the Georgian Orthodox Church, Ilia II, and was officiated by two Bishops Metropolitan, Theodore and Gerasimos. This marriage united the two branches of the Georgian former royal family with competing claims to the rights to the throne of Georgia – those of Gruzinsky and of Mukhrani – and drew a crowd of 3,000 spectators, officials, and foreign diplomats, as well as extensive coverage by the Georgian media.

The dynastic significance of the wedding lay in the fact that, amid the turmoil in political partisanship that has roiled Georgia since its independence in 1991, Patriarch Ilia II of Georgia publicly called for restoration of the monarchy as a path toward national unity in October 2007. Without naming any preferred claimant, prior to Prince David and Princess Ana's wedding, Patriarch Ilia II had emphasized the need to prepare the populace for restoration of the monarchy, "and elect a Bagration, to be educated from childhood" to take the crown. Although this led some politicians and parties to entertain the notion of a Georgian constitutional monarchy, competition arose among the old dynasty's princes and supporters, as historians and jurists debated which Bagrationi has the strongest hereditary right to a throne that has been vacant since the 1800s. Although some Georgian monarchists support the Gruzinsky branch's claim, others support that of the repatriated Mukhrani branch. Both branches descend in unbroken, legitimate male line from the medieval kings of Georgia down to King Constantine II of Georgia who died in 1505.

Whereas the Bagration-Mukhrani (Bagrationi-Mukhraneli) was a cadet branch of the former Royal House of Kartli, it became the genealogically senior line of the Bagrationi dynasty in the early 20th century: yet the elder branch had lost the kingship of Kartli by 1724.

Meanwhile, the Bagration-Gruzinsky line, although junior to the Mukhrani genealogically, reigned over the kingdom of Kakheti, re-united the two eastern Georgian realms in the kingdom of Kartli-Kakheti in 1762, and did not lose sovereignty until Russian annexation in 1801.

Bagrationi is the only member of his branch who retains Georgian citizenship and residence since the death of his father in 2008. Aside from his unmarried elder brother, he is senior in male-line descent of the Bagration family, while Ana's father, Prince Nugzar Bagration-Gruzinsky, is the only remaining prince who descends in male line George XII, the last king to reign over the united Kartli and Kakheti kingdom. The marriage between Nugzar Gruzinsky's heiress and the Mukhrani heir potentially resolves their rivalry for the claim to the throne, which had divided Georgian monarchists:

There had been reports of marital discord since April 2009. In December 2009, in a Georgian version of The Moment of Truth on Imedi TV the Georgian actress Shorena Begashvili admitted to having an affair with Bagrationi. Georgian Interior Minister Vano Merabishvili alleged in an interview published by Russian newspaper Kommersant on 7 April 2010 that their marital union had been arranged with the primary purpose of promoting the restoration of the Georgian monarchy under the Bagrationi. Therefore, according to Merabishvili, Anna Bagration-Gruzinsky was forced to divorce her first husband, Grigol Malania, in order to allow her to wed Bagrationi. At that time Merabishvili claimed that the Bagrationi couple were no longer married. However it was rumoured by the Georgian press that the couple had reconciled and was expecting their first child.

The couple are said to have retaken their marital vows in a civil ceremony on 12 November 2010 in Madrid.

The couple's only child, a son, Giorgi, was born in Madrid on 27 September 2011 and baptized by Patriarch Ilia II at the Svetitskhoveli Cathedral in Mtskheta on 3 November 2013.

On 15 December 2013, the official statement from Bagrationi posted on the website "Royal House of Georgia" confirmed his divorce from Anna. Giorgi remains the only son of either spouse, and the only son and grandson, respectively, of the rival Bagrationi pretenders, Prince David and Prince Nugzar.

In 2020, he married Irina Begashvili.

Ancestors

Honours
  Spain (military, Civil Guard): Medal of the Centennial of the Virgen del Pilar - Medalla del Centenario de la Virgen del Pilar
  United States (Veterans and Hereditary Association):  Military Order of Foreign Wars
  United Kingdom (Charitable Order): Grand Companion, Badge of Mercy, League of Mercy

Dynastic Orders of Knighthood

  Bagrationi Dynasty (Royal House of Georgia): Grand Master Grand Collar of the Order of the Eagle of Georgia
  Bagrationi Dynasty (Royal House of Georgia): Grand Master Senator of the Grand Badge Order of Queen Tamar
  Bagrationi Dynasty (Royal House of Georgia): Grand Master Order of the Crown of Georgia
  Royal House of Portugal: Grand Cross of the Order of the Immaculate Conception of Vila Viçosa
  House of Petrovic-Njegos, Montenegro: Grand Cross of the Order of Prince Danilo I
  Royal House of Sulu: Grand Cordon of the Royal and Hashemite Order of the Pearl

See also 
Monarchism of Georgia
Georgian monarchs family tree of Bagrationi dynasty

References

Notes 

A.It has never been clarified if Queen Elizabeth II accepted this as an honour for herself.

External links 
 Royal House of Bagration of Georgia
 Heraldry of the Royal House of Bagration-Mouchraneli 
  Монархом Грузии может стать Князь Давид Георгиевич Багратион-Мухранский. Russkaya Liniya. 29 February 2008.

|-

|-

|-

1976 births
Living people
House of Mukhrani
Spanish people of Georgian descent
Pretenders to the Georgian throne
Recipients of the Order of Saint Lazarus (statuted 1910)
Knights Grand Cross of the Order of the Immaculate Conception of Vila Viçosa